Syeda Madiha Imam is a Pakistani VJ-turned-actress and television host. She is known for her roles in Heer (2015) and Dhaani (2016).

She made her film debut with Dear Maya in 2017. She appears in the hit Pakistani series Dushmaan-E-Jaan (2020) on ARY Digital. She played Raima in the drama serial Muqaddar with Faysal Quraishi and it was her third serial with him, with the first two being Zakham & Baba Jani and the hit web series Ek Jhooti Love Story (2020) with Bilal Abbas. She recently acted in the series Mujhay Vida Kar on ARY Digital, opposite Muneeb Butt and Raza Taalish alongside Saboor Aly, where she played as Rida. She appeared in the hit Pakistani series Ishq Jalebi (2021) on Geo Entertainment with Wahaj Ali. She also appeared in Dil-e-Momin opposite Faysal Quraishi, which also aired on Geo Entertainment.

Career
Her television debut was in the Hum TV drama Ishq Mein Teray (2013) opposite Mehwish Hayat and Azfar Rehman, where she played the supporting role of Laiba. Subsequently, she became known for her leading roles in Heer (2015), Dhaani (2016), Saanp Seerhi (2017), Zoya Swaleha (2017) and Zakham (2017). Imam also appeared in a Bollywood movie Dear Maya (2017) opposite Manisha Koirala. In 2018, she appeared in Faiza Iftikhar's Baba Jani aired on Geo Entertainment. Currently, her drama, Chauraha is airing on Geo Entertainment.

Filmography

Films

Television

As host

Telefilms

Web

References

External links

Pakistani television actresses
21st-century Pakistani actresses
Living people
1991 births